Grindon may refer to:

Places
Grindon, County Durham, England
Grindon, Northumberland, a location in England
Grindon, Sunderland, Tyne and Wear, England
Grindon, Staffordshire, England

Other
Leopold Hartley Grindon